This is a list of the Australian moth species of the family Tortricidae. It also acts as an index to the species articles and forms part of the full List of moths of Australia.

Chlidanotinae

Chlidanotini
Caenognosis incisa Walsingham, 1900
Daulocnema epicharis Common, 1965
Leurogyia peristictum Common, 1965
Trymalitis climacias Meyrick, 1911
Trymalitis optima Meyrick, 1911

Hilarographini
Thaumatographa pampoecila (Turner, 1913)

Polyorthini
Apura xanthosoma Turner, 1916
Polylopha epidesma Lower, 1901
Polylopha phaeolopha (Turner, 1925)

Olethreutinae

Bactrini
Bactra ablabes Turner, 1946
Bactra anthracosema Turner, 1916
Bactra blepharopis Meyrick, 1911
Bactra capnopepla Turner, 1946
Bactra opatanias Meyrick, 1911
Bactra psammitis Turner, 1916
Bactra scalopias Meyrick, 1911
Bactra testudinea Turner, 1916
Bactra venosana (Zeller, 1847)
Bactra xuthochyta (Turner, 1945)
Endothenia polymetalla (Turner, 1916)
Syntozyga anconia (Meyrick, 1911)
Syntozyga psammetalla Lower, 1901
Syntozyga sedifera (Meyrick, 1911)

Enarmoniini
Aglaogonia eupena (Turner, 1946)
Aglaogonia historica (Meyrick, 1920)
Anathamna plana Meyrick, 1911
Ancyclophyes monochroa Diakonoff, 1984
Ancylis acromochla (Turner, 1946)
Ancylis anguillana (Meyrick, 1881)
Ancylis argillacea (Turner, 1916)
Ancylis artifica (Meyrick, 1911)
Ancylis biscissana (Meyrick, 1881)
Ancylis carpalima Meyrick, 1911
Ancylis colonota (Meyrick, 1911)
Ancylis coronopa (Meyrick, 1911)
Ancylis erythrana (Meyrick, 1881)
Ancylis erythrosema (Turner, 1945)
Ancylis fidana (Meyrick, 1881)
Ancylis hibbertiana (Meyrick, 1881)
Ancylis himerodana (Meyrick, 1881)
Ancylis infectana (Meyrick, 1881)
Ancylis longestriata (Durrant, 1891)
Ancylis mesoscia (Meyrick, 1911)
Ancylis ochropepla (Turner, 1926)
Ancylis phileris (Meyrick, 1910)
Ancylis pseustis (Meyrick, 1911)
Ancylis sciodelta (Meyrick, 1921)
Ancylis segetana (Meyrick, 1881)
Ancylis stilpna (Turner, 1925)
Ancylis synomotis (Meyrick, 1911)
Ancylis volutana (Meyrick, 1881)
Anthozela hilaris (Turner, 1916)
Balbidomaga uptoni Horak, 2006
Cyphophanes gracilivalva Horak, 2006
Eucosmogastra miltographa (Meyrick, 1907)
Eucosmogastra poetica (Meyrick, 1909)
Eucosmogastra pyrrhopa (Lower, 1896)
Helictophanes myrolychna (Turner, 1946)
Helictophanes prospera (Meyrick, 1909)
Helictophanes scambodes (Meyrick, 1911)
Helictophanes uberana Meyrick, 1881
Irianassa aetheria (Turner, 1946)
Loboschiza delomilta (Turner, 1946)
Loboschiza deloxantha (Turner, 1946)
Loboschiza exemplaris (Meyrick, 1911)
Loboschiza furiosa (Meyrick, 1921)
Loboschiza hemicosma (Lower, 1908)
Loboschiza koenigiana (Fabricius, 1775)
Loboschiza martia (Meyrick, 1911)
Loboschiza thoenarcha (Meyrick, 1911)
Metaselena allophlebodes Horak & Sauter, 1981
Metaselena lepta Horak & Sauter, 1981
Oriodryas olbophora Turner, 1925
Periphoeba trepida (Meyrick, 1911)
Pseudancylis acrogypsa (Turner, 1916)
Pternidora phloeotis Meyrick, 1911
Tetramoera gracilistria (Turner, 1946)
Thysanocrepis crossota (Meyrick, 1911)
Toonavora aellaea (Turner, 1916)

Eucosmini
Acroclita bryopa (Meyrick, 1911)
Coenobiodes melanocosma (Turner, 1916)
Crocidosema apicinota (Turner, 1946)
Crocidosema lantana (Busck, 1910)
Crocidosema plebejana Zeller, 1847
Eccoptocera australis Horak, 2006
Epiblema strenuana (Walker, 1863)
Eucosmophyes commoni Horak, 2006
Fibuloides minuta Horak, 2006
Fibuloides phycitipalpia Horak, 2006
Heleanna chloreis (Turner, 1916)
Hermenias epidola Meyrick, 1911
Hermenias rivulifera Turner, 1946
Herpystis avida Meyrick, 1911
Holocola aethalostola (Turner, 1946)
Holocola ammostigma (Turner, 1946)
Holocola argyrotypa (Turner, 1927)
Holocola atmophanes (Turner, 1946)
Holocola baeodes (Turner, 1946)
Holocola chalcitis (Meyrick, 1911)
Holocola chlidana (Turner, 1927)
Holocola deloschema (Turner, 1914)
Holocola ebenostigma (Turner, 1946)
Holocola fluidana (Meyrick, 1881)
Holocola honesta (Meyrick, 1911)
Holocola hypomolybda (Turner, 1927)
Holocola imbrifera (Meyrick, 1911)
Holocola ischalea (Meyrick, 1911)
Holocola liturata (Turner, 1925)
Holocola lucifera (Turner, 1946)
Holocola melanographa (Turner, 1916)
Holocola morosa (Meyrick, 1911)
Holocola niphosticha (Turner, 1946)
Holocola nitida (Turner, 1946)
Holocola notosphena (Turner, 1946)
Holocola obeliscana (Meyrick, 1881)
Holocola opsia (Meyrick, 1911)
Holocola pellopis (Turner, 1946)
Holocola peraea (Meyrick, 1911)
Holocola pericyphana (Meyrick, 1881)
Holocola periptycha (Turner, 1946)
Holocola perspectana (Walker, 1863)
Holocola phaeoscia (Turner, 1916)
Holocola plinthinana (Meyrick, 1881)
Holocola seditiosana (Meyrick, 1881)
Holocola sicariana (Meyrick, 1881)
Holocola sollicitana (Meyrick, 1881)
Holocola spanistis (Meyrick, 1911)
Holocola spodostola (Turner, 1946)
Holocola striphromita (Turner, 1946)
Holocola tarachodes (Meyrick, 1911)
Holocola thalassinana Meyrick, 1881
Holocola tranquilla (Meyrick, 1911)
Holocola triangulana Meyrick, 1881
Holocola vitiosa (Meyrick, 1911)
Holocola zopherana (Meyrick, 1881)
Icelita indentata (Bradley, 1957)
Icelita monela Clarke, 1976
Melanodaedala scopulosana (Meyrick, 1881)
Noduliferola neothela (Turner, 1916)
Rhopobota hortaria (Meyrick, 1911)
Spilonota acrosema (Turner, 1946)
Spilonota constrictana (Meyrick, 1881)
Spilonota quietana (Meyrick, 1881)
Spilonota ruficomana (Meyrick, 1881)
Strepsicrates dyselia (Turner, 1946)
Strepsicrates ebenocosma (Turner, 1946)
Strepsicrates ejectana (Walker, 1863)
Strepsicrates infensa (Meyrick, 1911)
Strepsicrates limnephilana (Meyrick, 1881)
Strepsicrates macropetana (Meyrick, 1881)
Strepsicrates semicanella (Walker, 1866)
Strepsicrates sphenophora (Turner, 1946)
Strepsicrates transfixa (Turner, 1946)
Tritopterna capyra (Meyrick, 1911)
Whittonella peltosema (Lower, 1908)

Grapholitini
Acanthoclita trichograpta (Meyrick, 1911)
Apocydia pervicax (Meyrick, 1911)
Archiphlebia endophaga (Meyrick, 1911)
Archiphlebia rutilescens (Turner, 1945)
Commoneria cyanosticha (Turner, 1946)
Cryptophlebia iridosoma (Meyrick, 1911)
Cryptophlebia ombrodelta (Lower, 1898)
Cryptophlebia pallifimbriana Bradley, 1953
Cryptophlebia rhynchias (Meyrick, 1905)
Cydia pomonella (Linnaeus, 1758)
Fulcrifera persinnuata Komai & Horak, 2006
Grapholita dysaethria Diakonoff, 1982
Grapholita molesta (Busck, 1916)
Grapholita amphitorna (Turner, 1916)
Grapholita antitheta (Meyrick, 1911)
Grapholita conficitana (Walker, 1863)
Grapholita floricolana (Meyrick, 1881)
Grapholita iridescens (Meyrick, 1881)
Grapholita parvisignana (Meyrick, 1881)
Grapholita tetrazancla (Turner, 1925)
Grapholita tornosticha (Turner, 1946)
Grapholita zapyrana (Meyrick, 1881)
Gymnandrosoma gonomela (Lower, 1899)
Ixonympha hyposcopa (Lower, 1905)
Leguminivora longigula Horak, 2006
Loranthacydia aulacodes (Lower, 1902)
Loranthacydia metallocosma (Lower, 1902)
Loranthacydia multilinea (Turner, 1945)
Loranthacydia pessota (Meyrick, 1911)
Loranthacydia sinapichroa (Turner, 1926)
Microsarotis sanderyi Komai & Horak, 2006
Notocydia atripunctis (Turner, 1946)
Notocydia lomacula (Lower, 1899)
Notocydia niveimacula Komai & Horak, 2006
Notocydia tephraea (Meyrick, 1911)
Pammenemina tetramita (Turner, 1925)
Pammenopsis barbata Komai & Horak, 2006
Parapammene dyserasta (Turner, 1916)
Thaumatotibia aclyta (Turner, 1916)
Thaumatotibia zophophanes (Turner, 1946)

The following species belong to the tribe Grapholitini, but have not been assigned to a genus yet. Given here is the original name given to the species when it was first described:
Argyroploce angustifascia Turner, 1925
Grapholita dentatana Walker, 1864
Sciaphila diffusana Walker, 1864

Microcorsini
Collogenes albocingulata Horak, 2006
Cryptaspasma brachyptycha (Meyrick, 1911)
Cryptaspasma sordida (Turner, 1945)

Olethreutini
Archilobesia drymoptila (Lower, 1920)
Aterpia protosema (Diakonoff, 1973)
Atriscripta arithmetica (Meyrick, 1921)
Cnecidophora ochroptila (Meyrick, 1910)
Costosa australis Horak, 2006
Dactylioglypha tonica (Meyrick, 1909)
Demeijerella chrysoplea (Diakonoff, 1975)
Diakonoffiana tricolorana (Meyrick, 1881)
Diakonoffiana vindemians (Meyrick, 1921)
Dudua aprobola (Meyrick, 1886)
Dudua iniqua (Meyrick, 1921)
Dudua phyllanthana (Meyrick, 1881)
Dudua siderea (Turner, 1916)
Eremas leucotrigona Turner, 1945
Eremas tetrarcha (Meyrick, 1920)
Euobraztsovia chionodelta (Meyrick, 1911)
Gatesclarkeana tenebrosa (Turner, 1916)
Gnathmocerodes alphestis (Meyrick, 1921)
Gnathmocerodes euplectra (Lower, 1908)
Gnathmocerodes ophiocosma (Turner, 1946)
Lobesia arescophanes (Turner, 1945)
Lobesia extrusana (Walker, 1863)
Lobesia parvulana (Walker, 1863)
Lobesia peltophora (Meyrick, 1911)
Lobesia physophora (Lower, 1901)
Lobesia symploca (Turner, 1926)
Lobesia transtrifera (Meyrick, 1920)
Lobesia xylistis (Lower, 1901)
Megalota helicana (Meyrick, 1881)
Megalota uncimacula (Turner, 1925)
Metrioglypha phyllodes (Lower, 1899)
Metrioglypha thystas (Meyrick, 1911)
Ophiorrhabda mormopa (Meyrick, 1906)
Ophiorrhabda mysterica (Turner, 1916)
Ophiorrhabda phaeosigma (Turner, 1916)
Oxysemaphora hacobiani Horak, 2006
Oxysemaphora notialis Horak, 2006
Podognatha vinculata (Meyrick, 1916)
Proschistis polyochtha Diakonoff, 1973
Rhodacra pyrrhocrossa (Meyrick, 1912)
Sorolopha archimedias (Meyrick, 1912)
Sorolopha cyclotoma Lower, 1901
Sorolopha delochlora (Turner, 1916)
Sorolopha elaeodes (Lower, 1908)
Sorolopha johngreeni Horak, 2006
Sorolopha leptochlora (Turner, 1916)
Statherotis amaeboea (Lower, 1896)
Statherotis batrachodes (Meyrick, 1911)
Statherotis euryphaea (Turner, 1916)
Statherotis pendulata (Meyrick, 1911)
Sycacantha atactodes (Turner, 1946)
Sycacantha castanicolor (Turner, 1946)
Sycacantha exedra (Turner, 1916)
Sycacantha niphostetha (Turner, 1946)
Sycacantha placida (Meyrick, 1911)
Sycacantha sphaerocosmana (Meyrick, 1881)
Sycacantha symplecta (Turner, 1946)
Temnolopha mosaica Lower, 1901
Trachyschistis hians Meyrick, 1921
Zomariana doxasticana (Meyrick, 1881)

Tortricinae

Archipini
Acroceuthes leucozancla (Turner, 1945)
Acroceuthes metaxanthana (Walker, 1863)
Aristocosma chrysophilana (Walker, 1863)
Atelodora agramma Lower, 1900
Atelodora pelochytana Meyrick, 1881
Authomaema diemeniana (Zeller, 1877)
Authomaema pentacosma (Lower, 1900)
Authomaema rusticata Meyrick, 1922
Clarana acrita (Turner, 1916)
Clarana arrosta (Turner, 1945)
Clarana arrythmodes (Turner, 1946)
Clarana atristrigana (Meyrick, 1881)
Clarana clarana (Meyrick, 1881)
Clarana hyperetana (Meyrick, 1881)
Clarana parastactis (Meyrick, 1910)
Clarana thermaterimma (Lower, 1893)
Constrictana catharia (Turner, 1926)
Constrictana constrictana (Walker, 1866)
Constrictana ephedra (Meyrick, 1910)
Constrictana ischnomorpha (Turner, 1945)
Constrictana leptospila (Lower, 1901)
Constrictana montanana (Meyrick, 1881)
Constrictana notograpta (Meyrick, 1910)
Constrictana ophthalmias (Meyrick, 1910)
Constrictana oxygona (Lower, 1899)
Constrictana plagiomochla (Turner, 1945)
Cosmoplaca cosmoplaca (Lower, 1903)
Euryochra cerophanes (Meyrick, 1910)
Euryochra euryochra (Turner, 1914)
Euryochra naias (Turner, 1916)
Glyphidoptera insignana (Meyrick, 1881)
Glyphidoptera polymita Turner, 1916
Isochorista acrodesma (Lower, 1902)
Isochorista chaodes Meyrick, 1910
Isochorista encotodes Meyrick, 1910
Isochorista helota Meyrick, 1910
Isochorista melanocrypta Meyrick, 1910
Isochorista panaeolana Meyrick, 1881
Isochorista parmiferana (Meyrick, 1881)
Isochorista pumicosa Meyrick, 1910
Isochorista ranulana Meyrick, 1881
Phryctora deuterastis (Meyrick, 1910)
Phryctora hedyma (Turner, 1915)
Phryctora leucobela (Turner, 1945)
Phryctora phaeosema (Turner, 1945)
Phryctora phryctora (Meyrick, 1910)
Phryctora tapinopis (Turner, 1945)
Rupicolana argyrocosma (Turner, 1925)
Rupicolana bleptodora (Turner, 1925)
Rupicolana camacinana (Meyrick, 1882)
Rupicolana catarrapha (Turner, 1945)
Rupicolana celatrix (Turner, 1916)
Rupicolana contortula (Turner, 1927)
Rupicolana crotala (Meyrick, 1910)
Rupicolana gnophodryas (Lower, 1902)
Rupicolana lenoea (Meyrick, 1910)
Rupicolana mermera (Meyrick, 1910)
Rupicolana orthias (Meyrick, 1910)
Rupicolana phosphora (Meyrick, 1910)
Rupicolana polymicta (Turner, 1927)
Rupicolana refluana (Meyrick, 1881)
Rupicolana rupicolana (Meyrick, 1881)
Rupicolana serena (Meyrick, 1910)
Rupicolana stereodes (Meyrick, 1910)
Rupicolana thiopasta (Turner, 1915)
Rupicolana tribolana (Meyrick, 1881)
Tarachota adynata (Turner, 1945)
Tarachota asemantica (Turner, 1927)
Tarachota ceramica (Lower, 1908)
Tarachota cnaphalodes (Meyrick, 1910)
Tarachota dryina (Meyrick, 1910)
Tarachota eugrapta (Turner, 1927)
Tarachota hemicosmana (Meyrick, 1881)
Tarachota leucospila (Lower, 1893)
Tarachota mersana (Walker, 1863)
Tarachota multistriata (Turner, 1945)
Tarachota notopasta (Turner, 1945)
Tarachota poliobaphes (Turner, 1927)
Tarachota scaphosema (Turner, 1945)
Tarachota tarachota (Meyrick, 1910)
Xenothictis sciaphila (Turner, 1925)
Acropolitis canana (Walker, 1863)
Acropolitis canigerana (Walker, 1863)
Acropolitis ergophora Meyrick, 1910
Acropolitis excelsa Meyrick, 1910
Acropolitis hedista (Turner, 1916)
Acropolitis magnana (Walker, 1863)
Acropolitis malacodes Meyrick, 1910
Acropolitis ptychosema Turner, 1927
Acropolitis rudisana (Walker, 1863)
Adoxophyes fasciculana (Walker, 1866)
Adoxophyes heteroidana Meyrick, 1881
Adoxophyes instillata Meyrick, 1922
Adoxophyes melichroa (Lower, 1899)
Adoxophyes panxantha (Lower, 1901)
Adoxophyes templana (Pagenstecher, 1900)
Adoxophyes tripselia (Lower, 1908)
Coeloptera epiloma (Lower, 1902)
Coeloptera gyrobathra (Turner, 1925)
Coeloptera vulpina (Turner, 1916)
Cryptoptila australana (Lewin, 1805)
Cryptoptila crypsilopha (Turner, 1925)
Cryptoptila immersana (Walker, 1863)
Dichelopa achranta Meyrick, 1910
Dichelopa dichroa Lower, 1901
Dichelopa loricata Meyrick, 1910
Dichelopa panoplana (Meyrick, 1881)
Dichelopa sabulosa Meyrick, 1910
Dichelopa sciota (Lower, 1916)
Dichelopa tarsodes Meyrick, 1910
Epiphyas ammotypa (Turner, 1945)
Epiphyas ashworthana (Newman, 1856)
Epiphyas asthenopis (Lower, 1902)
Epiphyas aulacana (Meyrick, 1881)
Epiphyas balioptera (Turner, 1916)
Epiphyas caryotis (Meyrick, 1910)
Epiphyas cerussata (Meyrick, 1910)
Epiphyas cetrata Meyrick, 1910
Epiphyas dotatana (Walker, 1863)
Epiphyas epichorda (Meyrick, 1910)
Epiphyas erysibodes (Turner, 1916)
Epiphyas eucyrta Turner, 1927
Epiphyas eugramma (Lower, 1899)
Epiphyas euphara (Turner, 1945)
Epiphyas euraphodes (Turner, 1916)
Epiphyas eveleena (Lower, 1916)
Epiphyas fabricata (Meyrick, 1910)
Epiphyas flebilis (Turner, 1939)
Epiphyas haematephora (Turner, 1916)
Epiphyas haematodes (Turner, 1916)
Epiphyas hemiphoena (Turner, 1927)
Epiphyas hyperacria (Turner, 1916)
Epiphyas iodes (Meyrick, 1910)
Epiphyas lathraea (Meyrick, 1910)
Epiphyas liadelpha (Meyrick, 1910)
Epiphyas loxotoma (Turner, 1927)
Epiphyas lycodes (Meyrick, 1910)
Epiphyas lypra (Turner, 1945)
Epiphyas ocyptera (Meyrick, 1910)
Epiphyas oresigona (Turner, 1939)
Epiphyas oriotes (Turner, 1916)
Epiphyas peloxythana (Meyrick, 1881)
Epiphyas plastica (Meyrick, 1910)
Epiphyas postvittana (Walker, 1863)
Epiphyas pulla (Turner, 1945)
Epiphyas scleropa (Meyrick, 1910)
Epiphyas sobrina (Turner, 1945)
Epiphyas spodota (Meyrick, 1910)
Epiphyas xylodes (Meyrick, 1910)
Ericodesma adoxodes (Turner, 1939)
Ericodesma antilecta (Turner, 1939)
Ericodesma concordana (Meyrick, 1881)
Ericodesma indigestana (Meyrick, 1881)
Ericodesma isochroa (Meyrick, 1910)
Ericodesma leptosticha (Turner, 1916)
Ericodesma liquidana (Meyrick, 1881)
Ericodesma pallida (Turner, 1945)
Ericodesma spodophanes (Turner, 1945)
Homona aestivana (Walker, 1866)
Homona fistulata Meyrick, 1910
Homona mermerodes Meyrick, 1910
Homona spargotis Meyrick, 1910
Homona trachyptera Diakonoff, 1941
Isodemis serpentiana Walker, 1863
Isotenes miserana (Walker, 1863)
Merophyas calculata (Meyrick, 1910)
Merophyas divulsana (Walker, 1863)
Merophyas immersana (Walker, 1863)
Merophyas petrochroa (Lower, 1908)
Merophyas scandalota (Meyrick, 1910)
Merophyas siniodes (Turner, 1945)
Merophyas tenuifascia Turner, 1927
Merophyas therina (Meyrick, 1910)
Neocalyptis molesta (Meyrick, 1910)
Procalyptis oncota Meyrick, 1910
Procalyptis parooptera (Turner, 1925)
Sobriana alysidina (Turner, 1927)
Sobriana arcaria (Meyrick, 1910)
Sobriana dyschroa (Turner, 1927)
Sobriana haplopolia (Turner, 1939)
Sobriana mnemosynana (Meyrick, 1881)
Sobriana ophiodesma (Lower, 1902)
Sobriana oressinoma (Turner, 1925)
Sobriana sobriana (Walker, 1863)
Sobriana stigmatias (Meyrick, 1910)
Standishana concolorana (Meyrick, 1881)
Standishana standishana (Newman, 1856)
Technitis agrypna (Meyrick, 1910)
Technitis amoenana (Walker, 1863)
Technitis campylosema (Turner, 1945)
Technitis campylosticha (Turner, 1939)
Technitis cataractis (Meyrick, 1910)
Technitis desmotana (Meyrick, 1881)
Technitis eusticha (Turner, 1945)
Technitis humerellus (Walker, 1866)
Technitis hydractis (Meyrick, 1910)
Technitis oriarcha (Meyrick, 1910)
Technitis phaeoneura (Turner, 1945)
Technitis polyphrica (Turner, 1927)
Technitis procapna (Turner, 1945)
Technitis technica (Turner, 1939)
Technitis technitis (Meyrick, 1910)
Technitis telephanta (Meyrick, 1910)
Technitis tephrodes (Turner, 1916)
Technitis tessulatana (Meyrick, 1881)
Thrincophora cinefacta (Turner, 1945)
Thrincophora dryinodes (Meyrick, 1910)
Thrincophora impletana (Walker, 1863)
Thrincophora inconcisana (Walker, 1863)
Thrincophora lignigerana (Walker, 1863)
Thrincophora signigerana (Walker, 1863)
Thrincophora stenoptycha (Turner, 1926)

The following species belong to the tribe Archipini, but have not been assigned to a genus yet. Given here is the original name given to the species when it was first described:
Capua belophora Turner, 1945
Arotrophora chionaula Meyrick, 1910
Capua confragosa Meyrick, 1922
Dichelia cosmopis Lower, 1894
Capua gongylia Turner, 1925
Capua leucostacta Meyrick, 1910
Capua nummulata Meyrick, 1910
Capua paraloxa Meyrick, 1910
Capua phellodes Meyrick, 1910
Capua promiscua Meyrick, 1922
Conchylis tasmaniana Walker, 1863
Capua tetraplasia Turner, 1916
Procalyptis albanyensis Strand, 1924
Capua castanitis Turner, 1925
Tortrix coctilis Meyrick, 1922
Apateta cryphia Turner, 1926
Capua effulgens Meyrick, 1910
Tortrix eucela Meyrick, 1910
Tortrix haplodes Meyrick, 1910
Tortrix incompta Turner, 1927
Capua incorrupta Meyrick, 1922
Tortrix notophaea Turner, 1926
Tortrix paurozona Lower, 1902
Anisogona placoxantha Lower, 1896
Argyrotoxa pompica Turner, 1925
Tortrix umbratilis Meyrick, 1922

Cnephasiini
Arotrophora anemarcha (Lower, 1902)
Arotrophora arcuatalis (Walker, 1866)
Arotrophora canthelias Meyrick, 1910
Arotrophora charistis Meyrick, 1910
Arotrophora diadela Common, 1963
Arotrophora ericirra Common, 1963
Arotrophora euides (Turner, 1927)
Arotrophora ochraceellus (Walker, 1863)
Arotrophora siniocosma Turner, 1926
Drachmobola strigulata Meyrick, 1910
Mictoneura flexanimana Meyrick, 1881
Paranepsia amydra Turner, 1916
Paraphyas callixena Turner, 1927
Parastranga macrogona Meyrick, 1910
Peraglyphis aderces Common, 1963
Peraglyphis anaptis (Meyrick, 1910)
Peraglyphis aphanta Common, 1963
Peraglyphis atherista Common, 1963
Peraglyphis atimana (Meyrick, 1881)
Peraglyphis chalepa Common, 1963
Peraglyphis confusana (Walker, 1863)
Peraglyphis dyscheres Common, 1963
Peraglyphis epixantha Common, 1963
Peraglyphis eucrines Common, 1963
Peraglyphis hemerana (Meyrick, 1882)
Peraglyphis idiogenes Common, 1963
Peraglyphis lividana (Meyrick, 1881)
Peraglyphis scepasta Common, 1963
Syllomatia pertinax (Meyrick, 1910)
Syllomatia pirastis (Meyrick, 1910)
Syllomatia xythopterana (Meyrick, 1881)
Symphygas nephaula (Meyrick, 1910)
Taeniarchis catenata (Meyrick, 1910)
Taeniarchis hestica Common, 1963
Taeniarchis periorma (Meyrick, 1910)
Tanychaeta neanthes (Turner, 1933)

The following species belongs to the tribe Cnephasiini, but have not been assigned to a genus yet. Given here is the original name given to the species when it was first described:
Mictoneura eurypelta Lower, 1920

Cochylini
Cochylis atricapitana (Stephens, 1852)
Eupoecilia acrographa (Turner, 1916)
Gynnidomorpha mesoxutha Turner, 1916
Lorita baccharivora Pogue, 1988

Epitymbiini
Aeolostoma scutiferana (Meyrick, 1881)
Anisogona hilaomorpha (Turner, 1926)
Anisogona mediana (Walker, 1863)
Anisogona notoplaga (Turner, 1945)
Anisogona simana Meyrick, 1881
Anisogona similana (Walker, 1863)
Anisogona thysanoma (Meyrick, 1910)
Asthenoptycha conjunctana (Walker, 1863)
Asthenoptycha craterana (Meyrick, 1881)
Asthenoptycha encratopis (Meyrick, 1920)
Asthenoptycha epiglypta Meyrick, 1910
Asthenoptycha hemicryptana Meyrick, 1881
Asthenoptycha heminipha (Turner, 1916)
Asthenoptycha iriodes (Lower, 1898)
Asthenoptycha sphaltica Meyrick, 1910
Asthenoptycha sphenotoma (Turner, 1945)
Asthenoptycha tolmera (Turner, 1945)
Capnoptycha cavifrons (Turner, 1926)
Capnoptycha ipnitis (Meyrick, 1910)
Capnoptycha tholera (Turner, 1925)
Capnoptycha zostrophora (Turner, 1925)
Capua intractana (Walker, 1869)
Debiliana debiliana (Walker, 1863)
Debiliana pentazona (Lower, 1901)
Debiliana symphonica (Turner, 1945)
Disputana disputana (Walker, 1863)
Epitymbia alaudana Meyrick, 1881
Epitymbia apatela Horak & Common, 1985
Epitymbia cosmota (Meyrick, 1887)
Epitymbia dialepta Horak & Common, 1985
Epitymbia eudrosa (Turner, 1916)
Epitymbia eutypa (Turner, 1925)
Epitymbia isoscelana (Meyrick, 1881)
Epitymbia passalotana (Meyrick, 1881)
Epitymbia scotinopa (Lower, 1902)
Euphona ammochroa (Lower, 1893)
Euphona decolorana (Walker, 1863)
Euphona dyslecta (Turner, 1926)
Euphona euphona (Meyrick, 1910)
Euphona oxygrammana (Meyrick, 1881)
Euphona plathanana (Meyrick, 1881)
Euphona pseudarcha (Meyrick, 1910)
Fuscicepsana cirrhoptera (Turner, 1927)
Fuscicepsana fuscicepsana (Walker, 1863)
Goboea copiosana Walker, 1866
Meritastis ferrea (Meyrick, 1910)
Meritastis illucida (Meyrick, 1910)
Meritastis laganodes (Meyrick, 1910)
Meritastis lythrodana (Meyrick, 1881)
Meritastis piperata (Meyrick, 1910)
Meritastis polygraphana (Walker, 1863)
Meritastis psarodes (Meyrick, 1910)
Meritastis pyrosemana (Meyrick, 1881)
Meritastis trissochorda (Turner, 1916)
Meritastis umbrosa Meyrick, 1910
Meritastis ursina (Meyrick, 1910)
Rhomboceros homogama Meyrick, 1910
Subfurcatana schematica (Turner, 1927)
Subfurcatana subfurcatana (Walker, 1863)
Trychnophylla taractica Turner, 1926
Vacuana vacuana (Walker, 1863)

The following species belongs to the tribe Epitymbiini, but have not been assigned to a genus yet. Given here is the original name given to the species when it was first described:
Capua dura Turner, 1945

Phricanthini
Phricanthes asperana Meyrick, 1881
Phricanthes diaphorus Common, 1965
Phricanthes flexilineana (Walker, 1863)
Phricanthes peistica Common, 1965
Scolioplecta allocotus Common, 1965
Scolioplecta araea Turner, 1916
Scolioplecta comptana (Walker, 1863)
Scolioplecta exochus Common, 1965
Scolioplecta molybdantha Meyrick, 1910
Scolioplecta ochrophylla Turner, 1916
Scolioplecta rigida (Meyrick, 1910)

Schoenotenini
Cornuticlava aritrana Common, 1965
Cornuticlava phanera Common, 1965
Cornuticlava spectralis (Meyrick, 1912)
Diactenis tryphera Common, 1965
Epitrichosma anisocausta (Turner, 1916)
Epitrichosma ceramina Common, 1965
Epitrichosma crymodes (Turner, 1916)
Epitrichosma hesperia Common, 1965
Epitrichosma luteola Diakonoff, 1974
Epitrichosma metreta Common, 1965
Epitrichosma neurobapta Lower, 1908
Epitrichosma phaulera (Turner, 1916)
Palaeotoma styphelana Meyrick, 1881
Proselena annosana Meyrick, 1881
Proselena tenella (Meyrick, 1910)
Syncratus paroecus Common, 1965
Syncratus scepanus Common, 1965
Tracholena dialeuca Common, 1982
Tracholena homopolia (Turner, 1945)
Tracholena micropolia (Turner, 1916)
Tracholena sulfurosa (Meyrick, 1910)

Tortricini
Amboyna diapella Common, 1965
Anameristes cyclopleura (Turner, 1916)
Asterolepis earina Common, 1965
Asterolepis glycera (Meyrick, 1910)
Exeristeboda exeristis (Meyrick, 1910)

External links 
Tortricidae at Australian Faunal Directory

Australia
 List